I Thought I Told You to Shut Up!! is a 2015 Canadian short documentary film by Charlie Tyrell about Reid Fleming, "the world's toughest milkman", a cartoon character created by David Boswell.

It was first shown at the South by Southwest film festival.

Cast

Awards and festivals 
 Arizona International Film Festival Winner: Best Documentary Short
 Palm Beach International Film Festival Winner: Best Short Film
 DOXA Documentary Film Festival Honourable Mention for Short Documentary Award 
 Hot Docs Canadian International Documentary Festival: Official Selection 
 South by Southwest Film Festival: Official Selection
 Chattanooga Film Festival: Official Selection
 Nashville Film Festival: Official Selection
 Athens International Film + Video Festival: Official Selection
 Brooklyn Film Festival: Official Selection
 Nantucket Film Festival: Official Selection
 Milwaukee Short Film Festival: Official Selection
 Palm Springs International Festival of Short Films: Official Selection

References

External sources
J E Reich. "Jonathan Demme Narrates Short Film About Cartoonist David Boswell and the World's Toughest Milkman". Tech Times. 20 October 2015.
Heidi MacDonald. "A Short Film about Reid Fleming, the World's Toughest Milkman has much to teach us". Comics Beat. 20 October 2015. 
Nadine Ajaka. "The Hollywood Impasse Around a 1970s Comic-book Character". The Atlantic. 30 October 2015.

External links

2015 short documentary films
Canadian short documentary films
2010s English-language films
2010s Canadian films